Friedbert Grams (24 March 1942 – 9 February 2022) was a German politician.

A member of the Christian Democratic Union of Germany, he served in the Landtag of Mecklenburg-Vorpommern from 1990 to 2002. He died on 9 February 2022, at the age of 79.

References

1942 births
2022 deaths
Democratic Farmers' Party of Germany politicians
Christian Democratic Union of Germany politicians
Politicians from Mecklenburg-Western Pomerania
Members of the Landtag of Mecklenburg-Western Pomerania
People from the Province of Pomerania